The following radio stations broadcast on FM frequency 95.2 MHz:

Bangladesh 
 Bangla Radio in Dhaka

China 
 CNR The Voice of China in Huaihua

Greece 
 Athens DeeJay in Athens

Ireland
 Clare FM in Ennistymon
 Highland Radio in Arranmore Island
 RTÉ Lyric FM in the Northeast

Malaysia 
 Era in North Perak, Padang Rengas, Kuala Kangsar and Central Perak
 Buletin FM in Malacca (Coming Soon)

Poland  
 Radio Ostrowiec in Ostrowiec Świętokrzyski

Turkey 
 Radyo 3 in Gaziantep

United Kingdom 
 BBC Radio Oxford in Oxford

References

Lists of radio stations by frequency